Finn Christian Ferner (10 March 1920 – 11 March 2001) was a Norwegian sailor and Olympic medalist.

He was born in Oslo and died in Nesøya. He received a silver medal in the 6 metre class with the boat Elisabeth X at the 1952 Summer Olympics in Helsinki, together with Johan Ferner (his brother), Erik Heiberg, Tor Arneberg and Carl Mortensen.

References

External links

1920 births
2001 deaths
Norwegian male sailors (sport)
Olympic sailors of Norway
Sailors at the 1952 Summer Olympics – 6 Metre
Sailors at the 1960 Summer Olympics – 5.5 Metre
Olympic silver medalists for Norway
Olympic medalists in sailing
Soling class sailors

Medalists at the 1952 Summer Olympics
Sportspeople from Oslo